Bunner Sisters is a novella published by Edith Wharton.

As Nancy Van Rosk writes, “’Bunner Sisters’ has had a long history of being overlooked. Rejected twice by Scribner's because of its length and its ‘being unsuitable to serial publication’”, it was eventually published in the 1916 collection Xingu and Other Stories.

References

Bibliography 
Edith Wharton, Bunner Sisters, Grandfather Clock series, flower-ed 2019, 

1916 novels
Novels by Edith Wharton